The Jefferies Building is a historic commercial building at 122 Madison Street in Clarendon, Arkansas. It is a two-story brick building, with a pressed metal facade that has a single storefront with a recessed entrance flanked by display windows. Built about 1904, it initially housed a dry goods store. It is one of Clarendon's few remaining metal-facade commercial buildings.

The building was listed on the National Register of Historic Places in 1984.

See also
National Register of Historic Places listings in Monroe County, Arkansas

References

Commercial buildings on the National Register of Historic Places in Arkansas
Buildings and structures in Monroe County, Arkansas
National Register of Historic Places in Monroe County, Arkansas
Commercial buildings completed in 1904